Antirrhinum kelloggii (syn. Neogaerrhinum kelloggii) is a species of New World snapdragon known by the common name Kellogg's snapdragon.

Distribution
It is native to the coastal hills and mountain ranges of California and Baja California. It grows in many local plant communities, especially in areas that have recently burned.

Description
This is a thin, sprawling annual herb which sometimes becomes vine-like, climbing nearby objects or other plants. The inflorescence consists of a solitary flower on a very long, strongly coiling pedicel up to 9 centimeters long. The flower at the tip is a dark-veined purple snapdragon over a centimeter wide. The fruit is a dehiscent capsule containing many bumpy seeds.

External links
Jepson Manual Treatment
USDA Plants Profile
Photo gallery
Photo gallery (as N. strictum)

kelloggii
Flora of Baja California
Flora of California
Flora without expected TNC conservation status